"My, My, My" is a number-one R&B single by American singer-songwriter Johnny Gill. As the second single from Gill's second self-titled album, the hit song, with backing vocals performed by After 7, as well as a jazz solo performed by saxophonist Kenny G, spent two weeks at number-one on the US R&B chart, and made the number ten on the Billboard Hot 100 charts. It was also Gill's only song to reach the Adult Contemporary singles chart, where it peaked at No. 32.  In 1991 the song won a Soul Train Music Award for Best R&B/Soul Single, Male. It's also known to be Johnny Gill's signature song. This song is listed as BMI Work #1039724.

Charts

Weekly charts

Year-end charts

Cover Versions
In 1990, saxophonist Gerald Albright covered the song for the album Dream Come True.

Samples

In 2015, Norwegian DJ and record producer Cashmere Cat and American singer Ariana Grande's song "Adore", which was featured on Cashmere Cat's debut album 9, featured a vocal interpolation of the song.
In 2020, American rapper Lil Mosey sampled the song on his hit single, "Blueberry Faygo", which was featured on his second album, Certified Hitmaker.

See also
 List of number-one R&B singles of 1990 (U.S.)

References

Johnny Gill songs
1989 songs
1990 songs
1990 singles
Contemporary R&B ballads
Soul ballads
Songs written by Babyface (musician)
Songs written by Daryl Simmons
Song recordings produced by Babyface (musician)
Song recordings produced by L.A. Reid
Motown singles
Smooth jazz songs
1980s ballads